Lobocarcinus sismondai  is an extinct species of marine crab in the family Cancridae.

Part of a Pliocene-aged carapace was recovered, and is housed in the Yorkshire Museum. Another fossil specimen was recorded by Lipke Holthuis in 1949, based on fixed fingers and an isolated dactylus. That specimen was recovered from Miocene–Lower Pleistocene deposits in the Netherlands.

References

Cancroidea
Prehistoric Malacostraca
Crustaceans described in 1859
Fossil taxa described in 1859
Pliocene crustaceans
Prehistoric life of Europe